Wayfaring Stranger is an album by American jazz flautist Jeremy Steig released on the Blue Note label in 1971.

Reception 

Allmusic's Thom Jurek said: "the group improvisation is at a premium, they move East, West, and even toward Latin  ... They are anything but difficult to listen to, however; in fact, they’re both gorgeous and reflect how wide-ranging Steig’s (and by turn Gomez’s) vision was for the time".

Track listing
All compositions by Jeremy Steig except where noted
 "In the Beginning" – 8:18
 "Mint Tea" – 5:20
 "Wayfaring Stranger" (Traditional) – 11:00
 "Waves" (Jeremy Steig, Eddie Gómez) – 5:54
 "All Is One" (Steig, Gómez) – 10:48
 "Space" (Steig, Gómez) – 5:43

Personnel
Jeremy Steig – flute
Eddie Gómez − bass 
Sam Brown − guitar (track 3) 
Don Alias – drums, percussion (tracks 1–4)

References

Blue Note Records albums
Jeremy Steig albums
1971 albums
Albums produced by Sonny Lester